The 2nd Fußball-Bundesliga (women) 2007–08 was the 4th season of the 2. Fußball-Bundesliga (women), Germany's second football league. It began on 19 August 2007 and ended on 25 May 2008.

North

South

References

2007-08
Ger
2
Women2